Zhu Haowen (born February 1967) is a Chinese politician. He was the mayor of Qinhuangdao, Hebei, China, before being transferred to become secretary-general of the Hebei provincial government.

References

1967 births
Living people
Mayors of places in China
Political office-holders in Hebei
Date of birth missing (living people)
Place of birth missing (living people)